In Mandaeism, Yasana is a heavenly gate in the World of Light. The term is mentioned in Chapter 12 of the Right Ginza, which describes it as "the great gate of Yasana, the place where a throne has been erected for the builder of the heaven and the earth".

See also
Tarwan

References

Mandaean cosmology
Conceptions of heaven
Afterlife places